New Gods: Nezha Reborn is a 2021 Chinese 3D animated fantasy action film directed by Zhao Ji and written by Mu Chuan, based on the character of Nezha from the Ming dynasty novel Investiture of the Gods. In the film, a steampunk and cyberpunk take on the story, Nezha is reincarnated as Li Yunxiang in the fictional city of Donghai (loosely based on 1920s Shanghai) and must settle a 3,000-year-old grudge with the Dragon Clan. New Gods: Yang Jian was released in 2022 as a sequel to this film.

The film was released in mainland China on 12 February 2021 (Chinese New Year). Netflix acquired global rights to the film except in China, and it was released on the platform on 12 April 2021.

New Gods: Nezha Reborn is not related to the 2019 film Ne Zha; they came from different production companies and have different distributors. New Gods: Nezha Reborn actually started production before Ne Zha did, but both films are loosely based on the same Ming Dynasty novel.

Plot 
Three thousand years after Nezha fought the sea, Li Yunxiang, a young motorbike rider in Donghai City, discovers that he is Nezha reborn. Before he has mastered his powers, his old enemies appear, and he must settle a 3,000-year-old grudge with the Dragon Clan.

Voice cast
Li Yunxiang 
Voiced by: Yang Tianxiang (Mandarin), Stephen Fu (English)
The main protagonist. He is a smuggler and courier and current reincarnation of Nezha
The Masked Man
Voiced by: Zhang He (Mandarin), Jason Ko (English)
A masked monkey who is believed to be the Six-Eared Macaque, but in reality, he is Sun Wukong the Monkey King. He is based on the Monkey King, Sun Wukong, from Journey to the West.
Ao Guang
Voiced by: Xuan Xiaoming (Mandarin), Andrew Kishino (English)
The main antagonist. He is the leader of the De Clan whose true identity is the Dragon King of the East Sea. 
Su Junzhu
Voiced by: Li Shimeng (Mandarin), Nicole Fong (English)
A doctor from Cijie hospital who enjoys competitive motorbike racing. Yunxiang's crush and lover.
Kasha 
Voiced by: Zhu Ke'er (Mandarin), Victoria Grace (English)
Yunxiang's childhood friend and a lounge singer.
Ao Bing
Voiced by: King Zhenhe (Mandarin), Jonny Siew (English)
The son of Ao Guang and the Dragon Prince who was defeated by Nezha in the past. He controls ice-based powers.
Li Jinxiang 
Voiced by: Guo Haoran (Mandarin), Harrison Xu (English)
Yunxiang's older brother. He supports his brother's job as a courier despite their father's wishes. 
Donghai Yaksha 
Voiced by: Gao Zengzhi (Mandarin), TBA (English)
Ao Guang's assistant.

Production 
New Gods: Nezha Reborn expands on the original story of Nezha from the Ming Dynasty novel Investiture of the Gods. It was directed by Zhao Ji and produced by Light Chaser Animation Studios, and it took four years to produce. Zhao Ji and Light Chaser previously collaborated on the 2019 film White Snake, which features some of the same cast and crew.

The cyberpunk city of Donghai was designed based on a mixture of Manhattan in the 1920s and '30s and Republic of China–era Shanghai, according to Zhao.

Release 
The film was originally scheduled for a summer 2020 release, but was delayed. In 2020 it was presented as a "work in progress" at the Annecy International Animation Film Festival and released a promotional video. In August 2020, its first official trailer was released. On 10 October 2020, a promotional poster was released and the film's release was announced for 12 February 2021 (Chinese New Year). It was screened at IMAX theaters in China on 6 February 2021, with a second round of screenings on 9 February.

In its opening weekend, the film grossed US$21.3 million.

Netflix has acquired streaming rights for the film outside of mainland China, and it was released on the platform on 12 April 2021.

Reception 

Critic Lim Yian Yu called the film "an interesting take" on the classic novel, and said it was "definitely a family-friendly movie that can be enjoyed by children and adults alike".

Sun Jiayin praised the decision to bring the character of Nezha into a setting 3,000 years after the original story, saying that this made the film distinct from the plethora of other Investiture of the Gods adaptations out there.

Sequel 
A sequel, New Gods: Yang Jian, was released in 2022.

References

External links 
 
 
 
 

Mandarin-language films
2021 computer-animated films
Chinese animated films
2021 3D films
2021 adventure films
2021 action films
Chinese action adventure films
Chinese 3D films
IMAX films
Works based on Investiture of the Gods
Animated cyberpunk films